Animbiigoo Zaagi'igan Anishinaabek First Nation is an Ojibwe First Nation in northwestern Ontario. It has a reserve on Partridge Lake called Lake Nipigon Indian Reserve within the town of Greenstone. It is a member of Waaskiinaysay Ziibi Inc.

References

Ojibwe governments
Ojibwe reserves in Ontario
Communities in Thunder Bay District